Love Never Fails is a collaboration album by American country artists, Barbara Fairchild, Connie Smith, and Sharon White. The album was released on August 12, 2003 on Daywind Records and was produced by Ricky Skaggs and Dorthy Leonard Miller. The album was collection of Gospel songs sung as a trio between the three artists.

Background 
Love Never Fails consisted of eleven tracks all recorded together by Barbara Fairchild, Connie Smith, and Sharon White. Most of the songs were Gospel material, however their style also gave it a Country pop sound to it was well, according to Slicpue.com. None of the other tracks were written by Fairchild, Smith, or White. The album's final track, "Walkin' Through the Fire" was written by country artist and Smith's husband, Marty Stuart. The album spawned two singles released in 2003: the "Closer to Home" and the title track, however both failed to chart.

Critical reception
Love Never Fails was reviewed by Slipcue, which gave it a fairly positive review. The website gave credit to producer, Ricky Skaggs for giving the album "a strong production" and giving the, "disc a lot more rhythmic ooompf than most albums on this popular Southern Gospel label." The website ultimately concluded by saying, "This album is probably too rowdy for most Southern Gospel fans (who really like tinkly pianos and less-twangy vocals), and while it probably won't wow many country listeners, for folks who are fans any of these three singers, this is kind of a treat. Plus, it's certainly a heartfelt performance, with a nice harmony sound among the trio... Very Jesus-y, but the emphasis is on inspiration and self-affirmation, rather than the evangelical side of things, so it may be more accessible to secular listeners. Worth checking out."

Track listing

Personnel 
 Jim "Moose" Brown – piano
 Stuart Duncan – fiddle
 Juraj Durovic – orchestra director
 Mark Fain – bass, session leader
 Barbara Fairchild – lead vocals, harmony vocals
 Paul Franklin – pedal steel guitar, string guitar
 Wayne Haun – conductor
 David Huntsinger – keyboards, piano, hammond organ
 Brent Mason – electric guitar
 Ricky Skaggs – electric guitar
 Connie Smith – lead vocals, harmony vocals
 Marty Stuart – mandolin
 Bryan Sutton – acoustic guitar, banjo
 Sharon White – lead vocals, harmony vocals

Technical personnel
 Dean Dixon – photography
 Norman Holland – artist and repertoire
 Michael Hradisky – assistant engineer
 Brent King – engineer
 Andrew Mendelson – mastering
 Josef Pokluda – contractor
 Calene Rader – make-up, hair stylist
 Cindy Rich – make-up, hair stylist
 Stanislava Vomackova – interpretation
 Kevin Ward – engineer

References 

2003 albums
Connie Smith albums
Sharon White albums
Barbara Fairchild albums
Albums produced by Ricky Skaggs